Sun Ray, Florida, is an unincorporated community in south Polk County, Florida. Approximately 90% of the community is on the east side of U.S. Highway 27. A railroad line runs diagonally south to north along the southwest boundary of Sun Ray.

As of May 2012, Sun Ray had approximately 345 houses and an approximate population of 685. Also, the community has a United Methodist church, a produce market, two gasoline/convenience stores, a large mini-storage facility, a restaurant and a motel. Sun Ray does not have its own postal address; it is assigned to the Frostproof, Florida, postal address.

References

Unincorporated communities in Polk County, Florida
Unincorporated communities in Florida